Office of The Chief Inspector of Boilers is a Bangladesh government regulatory agency that is responsible for inspection of commercial boilers in factories in Bangladesh. Engineer Mohammad Abdul Mannan is the Chief Inspector Of Boilers. He has served in this position since 2015.

History
Office of The Chief Inspector of Boilers traces its origin to a boiler safely act created in 1923 during the British colonial rule. In 1924, first boiler inspection department was established in Kolkata. After the Partition of India in 1947, a new inspection department was created for Pakistan in 1961. After the Independence of Bangladesh in 1971, this department became the Office of The Chief Inspector of Boilers. In 2017, there was six inspectors under the office who were responsible for inspecting 5,000 boilers in Bangladesh. It is under the Ministry of Industries but the Ministry of Labour and Employment (Bangladesh) wants the department to be moved under its Department of Inspection for Factories and Establishments.

References

1972 establishments in Bangladesh
Organisations based in Dhaka
Government agencies of Bangladesh